WGIE (92.7 FM) is a country music-formatted broadcast radio station licensed to Clarksburg, West Virginia, serving Clarksburg and Harrison County, West Virginia.  WGIE is owned and operated by Burbach Broadcasting Company.

History
WGIE was formerly known as WVHF, which went by the name "V93" in the late 1980s and early 1990s, during which time it was a rock station. Prior to that time, it was known as WVHF "Stereo 93", which had an adult contemporary format. The station was assigned the WGIE call letters by the Federal Communications Commission on September 27, 2002.   WGIE joined the Froggy Country Network in September 2002.  The Froggy Country Network now covers 11 counties in Northern West Virginia.

References

External links
 Froggy Country Online
 

GIE
GIE
Radio stations established in 1975
Harrison County, West Virginia